Anna-Karin Tornberg is a Swedish mathematician currently at Royal Institute of Technology who was awarded the Göran Gustafsson Prize and Leslie Fox Prize for Numerical Analysis and elected to the Royal Swedish Academy of Engineering Sciences. Her research concerns computational mathematics.

As a faculty member at New York University in 2006, Tornberg won a Sloan Research Fellowship. She was an invited speaker on numerical analysis and scientific computing at the 2018 International Congress of Mathematicians. She is an alumnus of the Global Young Academy

References

External links

Year of birth missing (living people)
Living people
New York University faculty
Academic staff of the KTH Royal Institute of Technology
21st-century Swedish mathematicians
Women mathematicians
Sloan Research Fellows
KTH Royal Institute of Technology alumni